Melonba is a suburb of Blacktown, in the state of New South Wales, Australia.

History 
Melonba is situated in the Darug traditional Aboriginal country. Melonba was approved as a suburb on 7 September 2020 and gazetted on 6 November 2020. Prior to the suburb's creation, the area was part of Marsden Park.

The origin of the suburb name is from the Dharug Aboriginal language meaning a type of wattle found in the area.

References 

Suburbs of Sydney
City of Blacktown